Bell Block may refer to:

 Bell Block (Los Angeles), California, US
 Bell Block (Ottawa), Ontario, Canada
 Bell Block, Taranaki, New Zealand